Miophyseter is an extinct genus of sperm whale in the superfamily Physeteroidea. It includes only one species, M. chitaensis, that was described in 2022 from the lower Miocene (Burdigalian) of Toyohama Formation, Chita District, Aichi Prefecture, Japan.  This species is known from the well-preserved cranium with detached teeth and ear bones (periotic, tympanic bulla, and malleus). Miophyseter is part of the Physeteroidea stem group, but more closely related to the crown group than to the macroraptorial sperm whales known from middle and late Miocene. Miophyster may have had an adaptation to deep diving and / or developed pterygoid muscles for active biting. The researchers made this conclusion judging by the presence of a deep and large notch on the ventral surface of the palatine bone and pterygoid.

References

Miocene cetaceans
Miocene mammals of Asia
Prehistoric toothed whales
Sperm whales
Prehistoric monotypic mammal genera
Prehistoric cetacean genera
Fossil taxa described in 2022
Fossils of Japan